In Silico is an album by the American electronic music group Deepsky. It was released in 2002. The title refers to the largely computer-based production methods employed during its creation, where the bulk of the music was composed using softsynths and Emagic Logic Audio 5 rather than external hardware synthesizers and traditional multi-track recorders.

The website AllMusic gave In Silico three stars out of a possible five, with the reviewer John Bush writing that the album "has it all: the low attention span of funky breaks, the streamlined groove of progressive trance, even the intelligent production and frequent changeups of techno".

Track listing 

"The Mansion World - Deepsky's Trippin' in Unknown Territory Mix" is a remix of the song "Mansion World", originally performed by Deadsy on the album Commencement.
The song "Ride" is used on the snowboarding game SSX3; the vocals were by J. Scott G.

References

2002 albums
Deepsky albums
Kinetic Records albums